Josh Eaves (born ) is a professional rugby league footballer who plays as a  for Swinton Lions in the RFL Championship.

He has spent time on loan from Saints at Whitehaven in Betfed League 1, and the Leigh Centurions in the Betfred Championship and the Super League.

Career
Eaves made his Super League début for Saints against the London Broncos in July 2019.

Leigh Centurions
On 17 March 2021, it was reported that he joined Leigh in the Super League on loan.

Wakefield Trinity
On 28 April 2021, it was reported that he had signed for Wakefield Trinity in the Super League on a short 2-week loan.

Leigh Centurions (loan)
On 4 August 2021, it was reported that he had signed for Leigh in the Super League on loan.

Newcastle Thunder
On 1 November 2021 it was reported that he had signed for Newcastle Thunder in the RFL Championship.

Whitehaven
In September 2022 it was reported that Eaves had signed for Whitehaven.

References

External links
St Helens profile
SL profile
Saints Heritage Society profile

1997 births
Living people
Leigh Leopards players
Newcastle Thunder players
Rugby league hookers
St Helens R.F.C. players
Swinton Lions players
Wakefield Trinity players
Whitehaven R.L.F.C. players